Lloyd Doth "L. D." Ottinger (born December 30, 1938) is an American former professional stock car racing driver. He raced occasionally in the NASCAR Winston Cup Series during his career. Driving the Black Diamond Coal No. 2 Chevy, he was a Champion in the NASCAR Late Model Sportsman series, predecessor of the Busch Grand National Series.

Cup Series 
Ottinger made his major NASCAR debut in 1966, where he drove for Ken Carpenter at Smoky Mountain Raceway. He started 21st in the 29-car field, but finished 28th after a crash on lap 33.

Ottinger's next start came in 1973 at Bristol Motor Speedway. He drove the #45 Chevy for James Bryant. Starting from the 11th position, Ottinger made his way through the field to the 2nd position. His next start was at Talladega a few weeks later. Driving the #02 Lonesome Pine Raceway Chevy, Ottinger started 26th and finished 10th. At another race at Charlotte, Ottinger had to settle for a 27th-place finish after his engine expired.

L.D. made four starts in 1974. However, L.D. did not finish any of the races and the best he could muster was a 25th at both Bristol events.

L.D. made his last Cup race in 1984, driving for Ron Benfield and the #98 Levi Garrett team, replacing the recently released Joe Ruttman for two races. He finished 21st and 22nd at Charlotte and North Wilkesboro Speedway, respectively.

Busch Series 
Ottinger made his Busch debut in the series first year of 1982. He started 8th in the #84 Kelly Builders Chevy at Charlotte. He was only able to complete 155 laps before he crashed out of the event.

In 1983, Ottinger made start. In his first race, he finished 4th at Rockingham, and also had runs of 24th at Darlington and 27th at Charlotte, retiring from both races with transmission problems.

His runs from previous Cup and Busch starts earned Ottinger a full-time ride in 1984. Driving the #10 Schlitz Pontiac, L.D. qualified for 26 of the 29 races. Despite not making those three races, he made up for it with three poles at Daytona, Charlotte, and IRP. Racewise, he had 3 top-5s, with his best being a 3rd at Martinsville. Along with 7 other top-10s, L.D. earned a 7th-place finish in points.

Ottinger was able to make all the races in 1985. Despite the fact that he had no poles or no wins, it was still a solid season. He matched his career best finish of 3rd, (Rockingham and Richmond. This led to 6th in the final points.

For 1986, Ottinger got funding from All Pro Auto Parts and moved over to the #2 Parker Racing team when CB Gwyn, owner of the #10 Pontiac team, sold the team to Parker. It resulted once again in a 6th place final showing, but in his first career win. It came at Langley Speedway, where he started fifth and dominated the race. In addition, Ottinger had  12 top-5s and twenty top-10s. His average start was a 10.5 and finish was 11.9, making it by far his best season.

In 1987, Ottinger fell to 9th in points. This was largely because of 9 DNFs. Also, Ottinger could only muster 6 top-5s and 10 top-10s. Despite that, Ottinger finished 2nd four times.

In 1988, Ottinger improved a little, but still finished 9th in the standings. He stayed in the #2, but had a new sponsor in Detroit Gasket. Once again, he did not win any races, but did earn his final Busch Series pole at Myrtle Beach. His best finish of the season was 2nd at Martinsville and Louisville Speedway. He had 5 top-5s and 11 top-10s.

Most important for Ottinger, he was able to return to victory lane in 1989, by virtue of winning the season finale at Martinsville. He had 7 top-5s and 16 top-10s, including a 2nd at Bristol. This improvement made a drastic rise in the standings for Ottinger, as he went to 4th in the final standings.

Ottinger won his final race at Bristol in 1990, in which it was marked by the violent crash of Michael Waltrip. However, the rest of his performance fell. He only managed 5 top-5s and 7 top-10s. Ottinger fell to 8th in the standings. Ottinger closed out his career with a 19th-place finish at Daytona, in 1991

Ottinger made a return to the track in 2009 to compete in a legends race at Bristol Motor Speedway. Ottinger finished 3rd in a field of twelve competitors which included Rusty Wallace, Terry Labonte, Harry Gant, and race winner Sterling Marlin.

Motorsports career results

NASCAR
(key) (Bold – Pole position awarded by qualifying time. Italics – Pole position earned by points standings or practice time. * – Most laps led.)

Grand National Series

Winston Cup Series

Daytona 500

Busch Series

ARCA Talladega SuperCar Series
(key) (Bold – Pole position awarded by qualifying time. Italics – Pole position earned by points standings or practice time. * – Most laps led.)

References

External links
 

1938 births
Living people
NASCAR drivers
ARCA Menards Series drivers
People from Newport, Tennessee
Racing drivers from Tennessee